Ducherow is a municipality in the Vorpommern-Greifswald district, in Mecklenburg-Vorpommern, Germany.

Transport
 Ducherow railway station is served by local services to Berlin, Angermünde, Eberswalde and Stralsund.

References

Vorpommern-Greifswald